Ñusta Huillac was a Qulla leader who rebelled against the Spanish in Chile in the 1540s. She was nicknamed La Tirana (Spanish for "the Tyrant") because of her alleged mistreatment of prisoners. The term ñusta comes from the Quechuan languages and (also spelled ñust'a) was a name for princesses in the Inca Empire.

According to legend, she fell in love with Vasco de Almeida, one of her prisoners, and pleaded with her people for him. After her father's death, she became the leader of a group of former Incas who were brought to Chile to mine silver in Huantajaya. Numerous tribes pledged their alliance to her and she became a symbol of resistance against the Spanish Conquest.

References

Year of death missing
Chilean women
Chilean people of indigenous peoples descent
1540s in the Captaincy General of Chile
Indigenous leaders of the Americas
Indigenous military personnel of the Americas
Chilean rebels
Indigenous rebellions against the Spanish Empire
Inca Empire people
Women in 16th-century warfare
16th-century women rulers
Women in war in South America
Year of birth unknown
Chilean legends
Indigenous women of the Americas
16th-century rebels

https://www.amexessentials.com/about-fiesta-de-la-tirana-chile/